Martin Luther King Jr., an African-American clergyman and civil rights leader, was fatally shot at the Lorraine Motel in Memphis, Tennessee, on April 4, 1968, at 6:01 p.m. CST. He was rushed to St. Joseph's Hospital, where he died at 7:05 p.m. He was a prominent leader of the civil rights movement and a Nobel Peace Prize laureate who was known for his use of nonviolence and civil disobedience.

James Earl Ray, a fugitive from the Missouri State Penitentiary, was arrested on June 8, 1968, at London's Heathrow Airport, extradited to the United States and charged with the crime. On March 10, 1969, he pleaded guilty and was sentenced to 99 years in the Tennessee State Penitentiary. He later made many attempts to withdraw his guilty plea and to be tried by a jury, but was unsuccessful. Ray died in prison in 1998.

The King family and others believe that the assassination was the result of a conspiracy involving the U.S. government, the mafia, and Memphis police, as alleged by Loyd Jowers in 1993. They believe that Ray was a scapegoat. In 1999, the family filed a wrongful-death lawsuit against Jowers for the sum of $10 million. During closing arguments, their attorney asked the jury to award damages of $100, to make the point that "it was not about the money". During the trial, both sides presented evidence alleging a government conspiracy. The accused government agencies could not defend themselves or respond because they were not named as defendants. Based on the evidence, the jury concluded that Jowers and others were "part of a conspiracy to kill King" and awarded the family $100. The allegations and the finding of the Memphis jury were later disputed by the United States Department of Justice in 2000 because of the lack of evidence.

The assassination was one of four major assassinations of the 1960s in the United States, coming several years after the assassination of John F. Kennedy in 1963 and the assassination of Malcolm X in 1965, and two months before the assassination of Robert F. Kennedy in June 1968.

Background

Death threats 
As early as the mid-1950s, King had received death threats because of his prominence in the civil rights movement. He had confronted the risk of death, including a nearly fatal stabbing in 1958, and made its recognition part of his philosophy. He taught that murder could not stop the struggle for equal rights. After the assassination of President Kennedy in 1963, King told his wife, Coretta Scott King, "This is what is going to happen to me also. I keep telling you, this is a sick society."

Memphis

King traveled to Memphis, Tennessee, in support of striking African-American city sanitation workers. The workers had staged a walkout on February 11, 1968, to protest unequal wages and working conditions imposed by mayor Henry Loeb. At the time, Memphis paid black workers significantly lower wages than it did white workers. There were no city-issued uniforms, no restrooms, no recognized union, and no grievance procedure for the numerous occasions on which they were underpaid. During Loeb's tenure as mayor, conditions did not significantly improve, and the gruesome February 1968 deaths of two workers in a garbage-compacting truck turned mounting tensions into a strike.

King participated in a massive march in Memphis on March 28, 1968, which ended in violence. On April 3, King returned to Memphis to attempt a successful new march later that week. His airline flight to Memphis was delayed by a bomb threat, but he arrived in time to make a planned speech to a gathering at the Mason Temple (world headquarters of the Church of God in Christ).

At the Mason Temple, King delivered his famous "I've Been to the Mountaintop" speech. In it, he recalled his 1958 attempted assassination, noting that the doctor who treated him had said that because the knife used to stab him was so close to his aorta, any sudden movement, even a sneeze, might have killed him. He referred to a letter written by a young girl who told him that she was happy that he had not sneezed. He used that reference to say:

King repeated the phrase "If I had sneezed" several more times, recalling numerous other events and acts of civil disobedience from the previous several years: the Albany Movement (1962), the March on Washington for Jobs and Freedom in 1963, and the Selma to Montgomery March (1965).

As he neared the close, he prophetically referred to the bomb threat:

Assassination
On Thursday, April 4, 1968, King was staying in room 306 at the Lorraine Motel in Memphis. The motel was owned by businessman Walter Bailey and was named after his wife. Reverend Ralph Abernathy, a colleague and friend, later told the House Select Committee on Assassinations that he and King had stayed in Room 306 at the Lorraine Motel so often that it was known as the "King–Abernathy Suite".

According to biographer Taylor Branch, King's last words were to musician Ben Branch, who was scheduled to perform that night at a planned event. King said, "Ben, make sure you play 'Take My Hand, Precious Lord' in the meeting tonight. Play it real pretty."

According to Rev. Samuel Kyles, who was standing several feet away, King was leaning over the balcony railing in front of Room 306 and was speaking with Rev. Jesse Jackson when the shot rang out. King was struck in the face at 6:01 p.m. by a single .30-06 bullet fired from a Remington Model 760 rifle. The bullet entered through King's right cheek, breaking his jaw and several vertebrae as it traveled down his spinal cord, severing his jugular vein and major arteries in the process, before lodging in his shoulder. The force of the shot ripped King's necktie off. King fell backward onto the balcony, unconscious.

Abernathy heard the shot from inside the motel room and ran to the balcony to find King on the deck, bleeding profusely from the wound in his cheek. Jesse Jackson stated after the shooting that he cradled King's head as King lay on the balcony, but this account was disputed by other colleagues of King; Jackson later changed his statement to say that he had "reached out" for King. Andrew Young, a colleague from the Southern Christian Leadership Conference, first believed King was dead, but found he still had a pulse.
 
King was rushed to St. Joseph's Hospital, where doctors opened his chest and performed cardiopulmonary resuscitation. He never regained consciousness and died at 7:05 p.m. According to Branch, King's autopsy revealed that his heart was in the condition of a 60-year-old man rather than that of a 39-year-old such as King, which Branch attributed to the stress of King's 13 years in the civil rights movement.

Shortly after the shot was fired, witnesses saw a man, later believed to be James Earl Ray, fleeing from a rooming house across the street from the Lorraine Motel. Ray had been renting a room in the boarding house. Police found a package dumped close to the site that included a rifle and binoculars, both with Ray's fingerprints. Ray had purchased the rifle under an alias six days earlier. A worldwide manhunt was triggered that culminated in Ray's arrest at Heathrow Airport, London, two months later. On March 10, 1969, he pleaded guilty to the first degree murder of Martin Luther King Jr., which was later recanted.

Responses

Coretta Scott King
King's widow, Coretta, had difficulty informing her children that their father was dead. She received a large number of telegrams, including one from Lee Harvey Oswald's mother that she regarded as the one that had touched her the most.

Within the movement

For some, King's assassination meant the end of the strategy of nonviolence. Others in the movement reaffirmed the need to carry on King's and the movement's work. Leaders within the SCLC confirmed that they would carry on the Poor People's Campaign that year despite the loss of King. Some black leaders argued the need to continue King's and the movement's tradition of nonviolence.

Robert F. Kennedy speech

During the day of the assassination while on the campaign trail for the Democratic presidential nomination in Indiana, Senator Robert F. Kennedy learned of the shooting before boarding a plane to Indianapolis. Kennedy was scheduled to make a speech there in a predominantly black neighborhood. Kennedy did not learn that King had died until he landed in Indianapolis.

Kennedy's press secretary, Frank Mankiewicz, suggested that he ask the audience to pray for the King family and to follow King's practice of nonviolence. Mankiewicz and speechwriter Adam Walinsky drafted notes for Kennedy's use, but he refused them, using some that he had likely written during the ride to the site of the speech. The Indianapolis chief of police advised Kennedy that he could not provide him protection and was worried that he would be at risk when talking about King's death before the predominantly black crowd. However, Kennedy decided to proceed. Standing on a flatbed truck, he spoke for four minutes and 57 seconds.

Kennedy was the first to tell the audience that King had died. Some of the attendees screamed and wailed in grief. Several of Kennedy's aides were worried that the delivery of this information would result in a riot. When the audience quieted, Kennedy acknowledged that many would be filled with anger. He said: "For those of you who are black and are tempted to be filled with hatred and mistrust of the injustice of such an act, against all white people, I would only say that I can also feel in my own heart the same kind of feeling. I had a member of my family killed, but he was killed by a white man." These remarks surprised his aides, who had never heard him speak publicly of his brother's death. Kennedy said that the country had to make an effort to "go beyond these rather difficult times" and quoted a poem by the Greek playwright Aeschylus: "Even in our sleep, pain which cannot forget falls drop by drop upon the heart until, in our own despair, against our will, comes wisdom through the awful grace of God." In conclusion, he said that the country needed and wanted unity between blacks and whites, and asked the audience members to pray for the King family and the country, again quoting the Greeks.

Kennedy's speech was credited with assisting in the prevention of post-assassination rioting in Indianapolis on a night when such events broke out in major cities across the country. It is widely considered one of the greatest speeches in American history.

Kennedy canceled all of his scheduled campaign appearances and withdrew to his hotel room. Several phone conversations with black community leaders convinced him to speak out against the violent backlash beginning to emerge across the country. The next day, Kennedy gave a prepared response, "On the Mindless Menace of Violence", in Cleveland, Ohio. Although still considered significant, it is given much less historical attention than is the Indianapolis speech.

President Lyndon B. Johnson
President Lyndon B. Johnson was in the Oval Office that evening, planning a meeting in Hawaii with Vietnam War military commanders. After press secretary George Christian informed him at 8:20 p.m. of the assassination, he canceled the trip to focus on the nation. He assigned Attorney General Ramsey Clark to investigate the assassination in Memphis. He made a personal call to King's wife, Coretta Scott King, and declared April 7 a national day of mourning on which the U.S. flag would be flown at half-staff.

Riots

Colleagues of King in the civil rights movement called for a nonviolent response to the assassination to honor his most deeply held beliefs. James Farmer Jr. said:

However, the more militant Stokely Carmichael called for forceful action, saying:

Despite the urging for calm by many leaders, a nationwide wave of riots erupted in more than 100 cities. After the assassination, the city of Memphis quickly settled the strike on favorable terms to the sanitation workers.

Reactions

On April 8, King's widow Coretta Scott King and her four young children led a crowd estimated at 40,000 in a silent march through the streets of Memphis to honor King and support the cause of the city's black sanitation workers.

The next day, funeral rites were held in King's hometown of Atlanta, Georgia. The service at Ebenezer Baptist Church was nationally televised, as were other events. A funeral procession transported King's body for  through the streets of Atlanta, followed by more than 100,000 mourners, from the church to his alma mater, Morehouse College. A second service was held there before the burial.

In the wake of King's assassination, journalists reported some callous or hostile reactions from parts of white America, particularly in the South. David Halberstam, who reported on King's funeral, recounted a comment heard at an affluent white dinner party:

Reporters recounted that many whites were also grief-stricken at the leader's death. In some cases, the shock of events altered opinions. A survey later sent to a group of college trustees revealed that their opinions of King had risen after his assassination. The New York Times praised King in an editorial, calling his murder a "national disaster" and his cause "just".

Public figures generally praised King in the days following his death. Others expressed political ideology. Governor George Wallace of Alabama, known as a segregationist, described the assassination as a "senseless, regrettable act". But Governor Lester Maddox of Georgia called King "an enemy of our country" and threatened to "personally raise" the state capitol flag back from half-staff. California Governor Ronald Reagan described the assassination as "a great tragedy that began when we began compromising with law and order and people started choosing which laws they'd break". South Carolina senator Strom Thurmond wrote to his constituents: "We are now witnessing the whirlwind sowed years ago when some preachers and teachers began telling people that each man could be his own judge in his own case."

FBI investigation
The Federal Bureau of Investigation was assigned the lead to investigate King's death. J. Edgar Hoover, who had previously made efforts to undermine King's reputation, told President Johnson that his agency would attempt to find the culprit(s). Many documents related to the investigation remain classified and are slated to remain secret until 2027. In 2010, as in earlier years, some argued for passage of a proposed Records Collection Act, similar to a 1992 law concerning the Kennedy assassination, to require the immediate release of the records. The measure did not pass.

Funeral

A crowd of 300,000 attended King's funeral on April 9. Vice President Hubert Humphrey attended on behalf of Johnson, who was at a meeting on the Vietnam War at Camp David; there were fears that Johnson might be hit with protests and abuse over the war if he attended the funeral. At his widow's request, King's last sermon at Ebenezer Baptist Church was played at the funeral; it was a recording of his "Drum Major" sermon given on February 4, 1968. In that sermon, he asked that, at his funeral, no mention of his awards and honors be made, but that it be said he tried to "feed the hungry", "clothe the naked", "be right on the [Vietnam] war question", and "love and serve humanity".

Perpetrator

Capture and guilty plea
The FBI investigation found fingerprints on various objects left in the bathroom from which the gunfire had come. Evidence included a Remington Gamemaster rifle from which at least one shot had been fired. The fingerprints were traced to an escaped convict named James Earl Ray. Two months after assassinating King, Ray was captured at London's Heathrow Airport while he was trying to depart the United Kingdom for Portuguese Angola, Rhodesia (Zimbabwe) or apartheid South Africa on a false Canadian passport in the name of Ramon George Sneyd. Ray was quickly extradited to Tennessee and charged with King's murder.

Ray confessed to the assassination on March 10, 1969. On the advice of his attorney Percy Foreman, Ray took a guilty plea to avoid a conviction and potential death penalty. Ray was sentenced to a 99-year prison term, but he recanted his confession three days later.

Ray fired Foreman and claimed that a man whom he had met in Montreal by the alias of "Raoul" was involved, as was Ray's brother Johnny, but that Ray himself was not. He said through his new attorney Jack Kershaw that, although he did not "personally shoot King", he may have been "partially responsible without knowing it", hinting at a conspiracy. In May 1977, Kershaw presented evidence to the House Select Committee on Assassinations that he believed exonerated his client, but tests did not prove conclusive. Kershaw also claimed that Ray was somewhere else when the shots were fired, but he could not find a witness to corroborate the claim.

Escape
Ray and seven other convicts escaped from Brushy Mountain State Penitentiary in Petros, Tennessee on June 10, 1977. They were recaptured on June 13 and returned to prison. A year was added to Ray's sentence.

Ray worked for the remainder of his life unsuccessfully attempting to withdraw his guilty plea and secure a full trial. In 1997, King's son Dexter met with Ray; he publicly supported Ray's efforts to obtain a retrial.

William Francis Pepper remained Ray's attorney until Ray's death. He carried on the effort to gain a trial on behalf of the King family, who do not believe Ray was responsible, claiming that there was a conspiracy by elements of the government against King.

Death
Ray died in prison on April 23, 1998, at the age of 70 from kidney and liver failure caused by hepatitis C (probably contracted as a result of a blood transfusion given after a stabbing while at Brushy Mountain State Penitentiary).

Alleged government involvement

Loyd Jowers

In December 1993, Loyd Jowers, a white man from Memphis with business interests in the vicinity of the assassination site, appeared on ABC's Prime Time Live. He had gained attention by claiming that he had conspired with the mafia and the federal government to kill King. According to Jowers, Ray was a scapegoat and was not directly involved in the shooting. Jowers claimed that he had hired someone to kill King as a favor for a friend in the mafia, Frank Liberto, a produce merchant who died before 1993.

According to the Department of Justice, Jowers had inconsistently identified different people as King's assassin since 1993. He had alternatively claimed the shooter was: (1) an African-American man who was on South Main Street on the night of the assassination (the "Man on South Main Street"); (2) "Raoul"; (3) a white "Lieutenant" with the Memphis Police Department; and (4) a person whom he did not recognize. The Department of Justice does not consider Jowers' accusations credible and refers to two of the accused individuals by pseudonym. It has stated that the evidence allegedly supporting the existence of "Raoul" is dubious.

Coretta Scott King v. Loyd Jowers

In 1997, King's son Dexter met with Ray and asked him, "I just want to ask you, for the record, um, did you kill my father?" Ray replied, "No. No I didn't," and King told Ray that he, along with the King family, believed him. The King family urged that Ray be granted a new trial. In 1999, the family filed a civil case against Jowers and unnamed co-conspirators for the wrongful death of King. The case, Coretta Scott King, et al. vs. Loyd Jowers et al., Case No. 97242, was tried in the circuit court of Shelby County, Tennessee from November 15 to December 8, 1999.

Attorney William Francis Pepper, representing the King family, presented evidence from 70 witnesses and 4,000 pages of transcripts. Pepper alleges in his book An Act of State (2003) that the evidence implicated the FBI, the CIA, the U.S. Army, the Memphis Police Department, and organized crime in the murder. The suit alleged government involvement; however, no government officials or agencies were named or made party to the suit, so there was no defense or evidence presented or refuted by the government. The jury of six blacks and six whites decided that King had been the victim of a conspiracy involving the Memphis police and federal agencies, finding Jowers and unknown co-defendants civilly liable and awarding the family $100.

Local assistant district attorney John Campbell, who was not involved in the case, said that the case was flawed and "overlooked so much contradictory evidence that never was presented". This civil verdict against Jowers has been claimed by some to have established Ray's criminal innocence, which the King family has always maintained, but it has no bearing on his guilty plea. In the United States, civil and criminal trials are always adjudicated independently. The family said that it had requested only $100 in damages to demonstrate that it was not seeking financial gain. Dexter King called the verdict "a vindication for us". At a press conference following the trial, he and his mother Coretta Scott King told reporters that they believed the mafia and state, local, and federal government agencies had conspired to plan the assassination and frame Ray as the shooter. When asked whom the family believed was the true assassin, Dexter King said that Jowers had identified Lt. Earl Clark of the Memphis Police Department as the shooter.

Counter evidence

In 2000, the Department of Justice completed its investigation into Jowers' claims, citing no evidence to support the conspiracy allegations. The investigation report recommended no further investigation unless new reliable facts were to be presented. A sister of Jowers said that he had fabricated the story in order to earn $300,000 by selling it, and that she had corroborated the story to get money to pay her income taxes. King biographer David Garrow disagrees with Pepper's claims that the government killed King. He is supported by author Gerald Posner, who wrote Killing the Dream: James Earl Ray and the Assassination of Martin Luther King, Jr. (1998), concluding that Ray killed King, acting alone, likely for the hope of collecting a racist bounty for the murder.

Critics of the official verdict on King's death bristled at Killing the Dream, criticizing Posner for, in part, basing it on "a psychological evaluation of James Earl Ray, which he [Posner] is not qualified to give, and he dismisses evidence of conspiracy in King's murder as cynical attempts to exploit the tragedy". Pepper repeatedly dismissed Posner's book as inaccurate and misleading, and Dexter King also criticized it. In response to the 1999 verdict in King vs. Jowers, Posner told The New York Times, "It distresses me greatly that the legal system was used in such a callous and farcical manner in Memphis. If the King family wanted a rubber stamp of their own view of the facts, they got it."

Other theories

In 1998, CBS reported that two separate ballistic tests conducted on the Remington Gamemaster allegedly used by Ray in the assassination were inconclusive. Some witnesses with King at the moment of the shooting said that the shot had been fired from a different location and not from Ray's window; they believed that the source was a spot behind thick shrubbery near the rooming house.

King's friend and SCLC organizer Reverend James Lawson has suggested that the impending occupation of Washington, D.C. by the Poor People's Campaign was a primary motive for the assassination. Lawson also noted during the civil trial that King alienated President Johnson and other powerful government actors when he repudiated the Vietnam War on April 4, 1967—exactly one year before the assassination.

Some evidence has suggested that King had been targeted by COINTELPRO and had also been under surveillance by military intelligence agencies during the period leading up to his assassination under the code name Operation Lantern Spike.

Minister Ronald Denton Wilson claimed that his father, Henry Clay Wilson, assassinated King. He stated, "It wasn't a racist thing; he thought Martin Luther King was connected with communism, and he wanted to get him out of the way." However, reportedly Wilson had previously admitted his father was a member of the Ku Klux Klan.

In 2004, Jesse Jackson, who was with King when he was assassinated, noted:

According to biographer Taylor Branch, King's friend and colleague James Bevel put it more bluntly: "There is no way a ten-cent white boy could develop a plan to kill a million-dollar black man."

See also
 Assassination of Malcolm X
 "I've Been to the Mountaintop"
 Post–civil rights era in African-American history

References

Explanatory notes

Citations

Cited sources

External links

 http://www.thekingcenter.org/civil-case-king-family-versus-jowers/  (Partial Transcripts of 1998 Trial), hosted by The King Center, Atlanta, Georgia.
 Department of Justice investigation of assassination, 2000 (following the Jowers' allegations)
 Congressional Report on King's assassination
 Shelby County Register of Deeds documents, Assassination Investigation
 Donald E. Wilkes Jr., "Death of MLK Still a Mystery" (1987), University of Georgia Law School.
 Donald E. Wilkes Jr., "What Are Facts of MLK Murder?" (1987).
 "The Accident on a Garbage Truck That Led to the Death of Martin Luther King, Jr.", episode of the Southern Hollows podcast
 Dr. King's Assassination, Civil Rights Digital Library.

 
1968 in Tennessee
1968 in the United States
1968 murders in the United States
African-American history in Memphis, Tennessee
April 1968 events in the United States
Assassinations in the United States
Civil rights movement
Crimes in Tennessee
Deaths by firearm in Tennessee
Deaths by person in Tennessee
History of Memphis, Tennessee
Assassination
Racially motivated violence against African Americans